Bağcı is a Turkish surname. Notable people with the surname include:

 Barış Bağcı (born 1975), Turkish actor
 Dilara Bağcı (born 1994), Turkish volleyball player
 Leyla Bağcı (born 1990), Turkish-Dutch female footballer

Turkish-language surnames